Asa Nu Maan Watna Da is a Punjabi movie directed by Manmohan Singh released in 2004 and starring Harbhajan Mann.

Plot 
Calgary-based businessman Kanwaljit Singh Dhillon sends money home to his brother, Deep, to invest in some property. Now with his wife; son, Mehr; and medical-student daughter, Aman; he returns home to Kapurthala to live with Deep for a year. They are very well received by Deep and his wife, Harbans, with Mehr and Aman both finding life partners in the outspoken Paali and Dr. Balvinder. Things change dramatically after Kanwaljit announces that he will not be returning to Canada, and will reside there permanently.

Cast
Harbhajan Mann as Meher
Kimi Verma as Paali
Neeru Bajwa as Arshveer Bajwa
Manav Vij Dr. Balwinder
Kanwaljit Singh 
Deep Dhillon
Navneet Nishan - Harbans
Vivek Shauq - Swami Ji
Gurpreet Ghuggi
 Preet Cheema Newcomer
Harby Sangha

Soundtrack 

Lohri
Long Gavaiyan
Nach Le Gaa Le
Lae Maaye
Yaara O Dildara
Ankhiyanch Needar

References

External links
 

Punjabi-language Indian films
2000s Punjabi-language films
Films set in Calgary
Films set in Punjab, India
Films scored by Jaidev Kumar